Super Commando Dhruva is an Indian comic book superhero created by Indian comic book artist and writer Anupam Sinha. Dhruva first featured in the title Pratishodh Ki Jwala in 1987. Since then, the character has featured in many titles published by Raj Comics, including solo issues, two hero and multi-hero crossovers, parallel series set in alternate universes, limited series and guest appearances. This list presents all these titles in order of publication; it also includes titles in which Dhruva does not appear but which are related to the character.

List of Dhruva titles
This table lists all Raj comics titles featuring Dhruva in chronological order. The primary publishing language for all Dhruva titles is Hindi however, many of these titles have since been translated and published in English as well.

Other related titles
A list of titles related to Dhruva, however, the character itself doesn't appear in these titles.

Soorma(SPCL #113): Nagraj and Parmanu fight against Dhruva's arch enemy Doctor Virus. Published in 1998.
Dhwast(GENL #1168): A kid named Vishesh mimics Dhruva's fighting style at home by wearing his costume in this Ins. Steel solo title. Published in 2001.
Warrior(GENL #1174): Cover art of this Ins. Steel solo title features a character that looks like Dhruva giving an impression that it's a two-hero issue however, Dhruva doesn't appear in the title. The Dhruva look-alike character on the cover of the title was actually a kid named Vishesh who wore Dhruva's costume and mimicked his fighting style at home in a previous Ins. Steel solo title Dhwast. Although he doesn't wear Dhruva's costume in Warrior. Published in 2001.
Super Toads(SPCL #302): Fighter Toads argue over who is the most fearsome superhero amongst Nagraj, Dhruva and Doga. They decide to find it out for themselves by imitating the crime fighting styles of their favorite superhero. Cutterr becomes Super Commando Toad in a bid to prove that his favorite superhero Dhruva is the most fearsome. Published in 2002.
Dead Force(SPCL #335): Dhruva's friend Chandika and arch enemy Dhwaniraj appear in a prominent role in this Parmanu title. In one frame, Dhruva's image is shown on a billboard that reads - Welcome to Rajnagar. Published in 2002.
Super Indian(SPCL #610): Debut title of Raj Comics superhero Super Indian. Dhruva doesn't appear in the comic per se however, Dhruva's image is used for a single frame in the comic as a part of story narrative tool. Published in 2005.
Yugandhar(SPCL #2528): The founding stone of Sarvanayak series; it had Adig, Bhokal & Yoddha as its principal characters and Ashwaraj, Gojo, Prachanda, Shukraal & Tilismdev in guest appearance. Dhruva's character doesn't appear in the comic per se, however, Dhruva's image is used for a single frame in the comic as a part of story narrative tool. Published in 2013.
Adrishya Shadayantra(SPCL 2599): Aakhiri: The Last Survivors series – Part 5. It features Nagraj, Kobi and Shakti in prominent roles and Parmanu in guest appearance. Dhruva's character doesn't appear in the comic per se however, he is referenced on multiple occasions in the comic and appears for two frames as part of story recap and a flashback scene. Published in 2016.

Limited series
This list enlists the limited series story arcs published by Raj comics featuring Super Commando Dhruva.

Dracula

Nagayana

Nagayana is an 8-part mega series featuring Nagraj and Super Commando Dhruva that was published by Raj comics in a span of 3 years from 2007-2009. It is a parallel series set in an alternate universe/parallel earth. It is a story based in 2025 A.D. exploring the future of Dhruva, Nagraj and their various other supporting characters in the alternate universe. The series was co-written by Anupam Sinha and Jolly Sinha, and the artwork for the series was handled by a team of various artists led by Anupam Sinha himself. Largely based on the Hindu epic Ramayana, the story of Nagayana as a whole as well as most of its sub-plots narrowly follow the same storyline as that of the Hindu epic with Raj Comic characters Nagraj, Dhruva, Visarpi and Nagpasha filling in the roles of original characters Rama, Laxmana, Sita and Ravana respectively. Earlier supposed to be a four-part series, this series was later converted into an 8-part series in order to fit in various sub-plots. The series ended with Dhruva and Nagraj sacrificing their lives to defeat Krurpasha (Nagpasha's alias in the series). Nagayana ends with the progeny of Dhruva and Nagraj taking over the responsibility to fight evil forces. Five years later, in 2014, Raj comics published a 32-page epilogue to the iconic 8-part series, thus laying a foundation for sequel to Nagayana, Mahanagayana.

Following is the list of titles published as a part of Nagayana series:

Kid Superheroes
Kid Superheroes is a series of free webcomic strips published by Raj Comics on their official Facebook page featuring the childhood versions of their superheroes. These strips are usually humorous and are targeted towards young children as part of a promotional policy to expand the publisher's reader base. Raj comics started publishing these free strips on their Facebook page in 2009. In 2014, they compiled these strips and published first issue of kid superheroes. Initially distributed as free gift with all online orders placed on 5 October 2014 - Free Comic Book Day, the issue was later sold commercially and became one of the bestsellers Raj comic title.

This table lists all Raj comic kid superheroes titles featuring Dhruva.

Collected editions
Many Dhruva titles have been reprinted in trade paperback format. Some of the titles have been translated in English and published in trade paperback format.

Deluxe editions
Nagraj-Pratishodh Ki Jwala Silver Jubilee Edition(DELX #1): In October 2012, Raj comics launched Nagraj-Pratishodh Ki Jwala Silver Jubilee Edition at the 2nd Mumbai Films and Comics Convention. It was a deluxe edition that collected the reprints of the debut issues of Nagraj and Dhruva on jumbo (34.6 * 24.8 cm) sized papers to commemorate the completion of 25yrs of the two most popular characters of Raj comics.

Special collector editions
These are special collected editions that collect all the titles of a single story arc or titles whose stories are closely related. Usually they are published in hardcover with alternative cover art. Sometimes they contain newly penned bonus pages.

Hindi digests
The following are collections of titles featuring Dhruva in trade paperback format.

English digests
The following trade paperbacks collected English translated versions of titles featuring Dhruva.

Miscellaneous Hindi digests
Following trade paperbacks collected one or more, but not all, titles featuring Dhruva.

Miscellaneous English digests
Following trade paperbacks collected English reprints of Raj Comics titles featuring Dhruva in one or more, but not all, of its collected material.

References

External links
Dhruva's comic list on official website
Raj Comics official website
Super Commando Dhruva on comicvine

Raj Comics
Dhruva
Dhruva